Prosoplus atlanticus is a species of beetle in the family Cerambycidae. It was described by Stephan von Breuning in 1938.

Subspecies
 Prosoplus atlanticus kusaiecus Gressitt, 1956
 Prosoplus atlanticus atlanticus Breuning, 1938
 Prosoplus atlanticus trukensis Blair, 1940

References

Prosoplus
Beetles described in 1938